Ker Sin Tze is a former Singaporean politician. As a member of the People's Action Party, Ker was a Member of Parliament for Aljunied GRC from 1991 to 2001.

Education
In his early years, Ker was educated at Xing Hua Primary School. He graduated with a Bachelor of Commerce from the then Nanyang University, Singapore in 1966. In 1968, Ker obtained his master's degree in economics from the University of Manitoba, Canada. He obtained his PhD in economics from the University of Manitoba, Canada in 1972.

Career
From 1994 to 2001, he was managing director of Yenom Holdings Pte Ltd. Both Liang Court and Yenom Holdings belonged to billionaire Goh Cheng Liang. On 1 March 2001, he was elected as an independent director to the Board of Tung Lok Group. He was chairman of Superior Metal Printing Limited (1990–1992, Sep 1994–1995); deputy chairman of the Chinese Development Assistance Council (Sep 1994–2000).

Political career 
Ker entered politics through a walkover in Aljunied GRC in the 1991 General Election. In the 1997 General Election, the PAP team faced opponents from the SDP and won 67.02% of the votes. He was Minister of State (Sep-Dec 1991) and later Minister of State for Education (Jan 1992) and Information and the Arts (Jan 1992-Aug 1994). Ker was the chairman of the Aljunied Town Council (Feb 1995) and the Government Parliamentary Committees for Home Affairs and Law (Aug 1995–1996). He stepped down from politics at the 2001 General Election.

Post-political career 
From October 2002 to June 2007, he was appointed Trade Representative in the Singapore Trade Office in Taipei. From July to December 2007, Ker was the special adviser to Minister for Foreign Affairs George Yeo, who was his Aljunied GRC teammate. Ker was the Consul-General in Hong Kong and Macao between 2008 and 2012.

Ker presently serves as adjunct professor at Lee Kuan Yew School of Public Policy, National University of Singapore, and at the Public Policy and Global Affairs programme of Nanyang Technological University.

References

1944 births
Living people
People's Action Party politicians
Singaporean people of Teochew descent
Nanyang University alumni
University of Manitoba alumni
Members of the Parliament of Singapore